Ted Wainwright (8 April 1865 – 28 October 1919) was an English first-class cricketer, who played in 352 first-class matches for Yorkshire County Cricket Club between 1888 and 1902. An all-rounder, Wainwright helped to establish the county at the top under Lord Hawke's captaincy, during the early years of County Championship cricket. He also appeared in five Test matches for England, although without any real international success.

Life and career
Edward Wainwright was born in Tinsley, Sheffield, Yorkshire, England.

Wainwright will be remembered for gaining the lowest bowling average in the history of the County Championship – 10.17 for 97 wickets in 1894, a summer of many sticky wickets. On these wickets, he would bowl a perfect length and his spin was such that the ball, "popping" from the crust of the turf, would gain pace so that not even the most technically correct batsman could hope to survive. However, Wainwright never had any sting on hard pitches. He did not take a single wicket in his five Test matches against Australia. Wainwright featured in four of the five Tests on Stoddart's 1897/98 tour of Australia, but found, not long into the visit, that his off spin was declining to turn. By the conclusion of the tour, Wainwright became convinced of his having lost the facility. When he arrived back in Yorkshire, Wainwright went straight to the nets and noted that the ball immediately started to spin in the manner to which he had been accustomed.

A better batsman than bowler, Wainwright suffered from inconsistency, but on his day could play brilliant innings characterised by powerful hitting. Among the best was his 116 which won the match against Kent in 1900. In fielding, Wainwright excelled as a close catcher; along with John Tunnicliffe he gave vital support to Yorkshire's powerful bowling attacks, holding forty two catches in 1895.

Wainwright first played for Yorkshire in 1888, and immediately established his place in the side, chiefly through an innings of 105 against the Australians. He developed slowly over the next couple of years, but his performance on a sticky wicket at Sheffield in 1891 was the performance that established Wainwright as a deadly soft-wicket bowler. Wainwright showed no advancement as a batsman until 1893, when he got close to doing the double and played his first Test at Lord's without success. Wainwright was Yorkshire's leading wicket-taker in 1892, though they fared only modestly, and in 1893, aided by some bad wickets due to a dry spring, he took 90 wickets for 12.55 each, to help Yorkshire win its first Championship. By this time, he and Bobby Peel were the finest slow bowling partnership in county cricket, and they were often unplayable when the wicket helped them.

In 1894, against Sussex, Wainwright took five wickets in seven deliveries and finished with figures of seven for twenty (thirteen for 38 for the match). Against Middlesex, he took ten for 63, and against Surrey twelve for 108. However, his harmlessness on the best pitch of the season at The Oval made sure that he was not chosen for The Ashes tour that winter. 1895 was disappointing as a batsman and bowler, but his fielding made him a vital member of Yorkshire's eleven. In the dry summer of 1896, he recaptured his ability to exploit the few sticky wickets, and got closer to a thousand runs than ever before.

In 1897, though expensive as a bowler, Wainwright hit five centuries and was named for the 1897/1898 Ashes tour in that capacity. However, he again did not perform well in the Tests. 1899 saw Wainwright again of little use as a bowler once the harder pitches came in June, but he played a career-best 228 at the Oval and scored almost as many runs as in 1897. With Rhodes and Haigh now Yorkshire's destroyers on sticky wickets, Wainwright did little bowling in 1900 and 1901 – his last two seasons – but his batting, though inconsistent, remained highly valuable as a last resort.

Shrewsbury and Cardus
Following his retirement, he went to work as a professional at Shrewsbury School, where he was to replace William Attewell as a young Neville Cardus' colleague. As Cardus recalled in his Autobiography (although he had the date wrong: Wainwright became coach at Shrewsbury in 1914, not 1913), "When I went back to Shrewsbury in 1913, I suffered a loss. I entered the house of Mrs. Rodenhurst and at once asked whether Attewell had arrived yet. 'No,' said Mrs. Rodenhurst; 'No, Mr. Attewell wasn't coming again to Shrewsbury; another gentleman had come instead, a Mr. Wainwright from Sheffield; he was to be the cricket instructor now, with, of course, you, Mr. Neville.' She'd heard that the School had told Mr. Attewell that they were engaging somebody else.

...Wainwright, of Yorkshire and All-England, was of the modern school. 'Pla-ay back; get thi legs reight.' He was at the extreme to Attewell; he belonged to a period that marked a transition in the development of the social life of the English professional cricketer; he was a bridge from the simple and dignified forelock-touching William to the Hammonds and the Sutcliffes, who burnish their hair and go to Savile Row for their clothes.

When Mrs. Rodenhurst told me of the advent to Shrewsbury of Wainwright, I asked her if he was in his room, or where. 'No,' she said, 'he went out about an hour ago. I think you'll find him in the King's Arms.' I went to the King's Arms and made my very first appearance in the bar-parlour of a public-house. The room was empty save for one man, dressed in blue serge, with a shrewd lean face. I recognised him. I had seen him playing for Yorkshire at Old Trafford. I introduced myself. 'I'm the assistant pro.,' I explained. 'Art thou?' he replied, 'well, then 'ave a drink wi' me.' I told him I didn't drink — only ginger ale. 'Christ,' he said, 'tha'rt a reight bloody cricketer.' He was a tall man, who walked as though he didn't care a damn for anybody. There was something sinister about him. Every night he got drunk as a matter of course, quietly and masterfully. One day he backed a winner at a glorious price, and towards eleven o'clock that night he and the drill-sergeant of the school arrived arm-in-arm (supporting one another) in the sitting-room of our lodgings. Very gravely Ted introduced me to the drill-sergeant, whom of course I knew very well. The drill-sergeant as gravely introduced Ted to me, then taking my arm, he whispered rather noisily in my ear, 'I'm 'fraid 'e's a l'il drunk, so I've jus' bror him h-home.' Whereupon Ted dissolved into helpless laughter and said, 'My dear sersergeant, don't be 'diculous. . . . Bror me home? Why, you ole fool, it's me that's bror you 'ome.' Then (aside), 'E's jus' a l'il drunk, so I've bror him home.' The sergeant hooted with glee. 'Bless m' soul,' he said, 'Ted; jus' lis'en t'me. If you'd bror me home, this would be my lodgin's, see? I would be 'ome, not you. See? But this is your lodgin's—so I mus' 'ave bror you 'ome. See?'

The syllogism was too much for Ted. He collapsed and fell on his umbrella which, though the night was hot, he had carried with him for hours neatly rolled up, and he broke it into two equal halves. We then, the sergeant and I, put him to bed, the sergeant all the time solicitously muttering, 'I bror 'im home. Jus' a l'il drunk, tha's all, pore f'ler.' Next morning Ted came down to breakfast fresh as a daisy and saw the broken halves of his umbrella which Mrs. Rodenhurst had carefully laid on the sofa. 'What the 'ell,' said Ted blankly. I told him what had occurred the night before. Ted reflected; 'Ah remember as far as commin' out of t' King's Arms wi' t' sergeant and gettin' as far as t' Royal Oak, An' Ah remembers nowt else.'"

Death
Wainwright died in Sheffield in October 1919, at the age of 54.

References

External links

1865 births
1919 deaths
England Test cricketers
Wisden Cricketers of the Year
Yorkshire cricketers
Cricketers from Sheffield
English cricketers
Players cricketers
Lord Hawke's XI cricketers
C. I. Thornton's XI cricketers
North v South cricketers
A. E. Stoddart's XI cricketers
English cricketers of 1864 to 1889
English cricketers of 1890 to 1918